Marita Fossum (born 14 March 1965) is a Norwegian writer. Her literary debut was the novel Verden utenfor (2002). She was awarded the Brage Prize in 2005 for the novel Forestill deg.

Awards 
Tanums Kvinnestipend 2005
Brage Prize 2005

References

1965 births
Living people
21st-century Norwegian novelists
Norwegian women novelists
21st-century Norwegian women writers